Chimanimani National Park (Portuguese: Parque Nacional de Chimanimani) is a protected area in Manica Province of Mozambique. It is located in the Chimanimani Mountains on the border with Zimbabwe. Together with Zimbabwe's Chimanimani National Park it forms the Chimanimani Transfrontier Park. It was designated a national reserve in 2003. In 2020 it was designated a national park.

Geography
The park has an area of 656 km2. It protects the Mozambican portion of the Chimanimani Mountains, including Monte Binga (2436 m), Mozambique's highest peak. The park has a larger buffer zone (1723 km2), which extends into lower-elevation areas to the south, east, and north, and includes the Moribane, Mpunga, Maronga, and Zomba forest reserves. The forest Moribane, Mpunga, and Maronga reserves were established in 1953.

Flora and fauna
The park contains rare species such as the Red-capped robin-chat and the Welwitsch's bat.

Culture
The locals preserve the cave paintings, ancient traditions and beliefs, all of which give the park a cultural identity.

Access
The Reserve can be reached across the border from Machipanda, the city of Beira (Beira Corridor) from the city of Chimoio. The reserve has several road connections with the north, center and south of Mozambique, as well as with Zimbabwe.

References

External links

Eastern Highlands
Eastern Zimbabwe montane forest-grassland mosaic
Geography of Manica Province
Protected areas established in 2003
National parks of Mozambique
Important Bird Areas of Mozambique